FK SSK Nova is a Macedonian football club based in the town of Drachevo in Skopje, North Macedonia. They are currently competing in the Macedonian Third League (North Division).

History
The club was founded in 1965, and was refounded in 2009.

References

External links
Club info at MacedonianFootball 
Macedonian Football Federation 

Football clubs in Skopje
Association football clubs established in 1965
1965 establishments in the Socialist Republic of Macedonia